Westcliff-on-Sea (often abbreviated to Westcliff) is an inner city area of the city of Southend-on-Sea, in the ceremonial county of Essex, England. It is on the north shore of the lower Thames Estuary, about 34 miles (55 km) east of London.

Geography

The cliffs formed by erosion of the local quaternary geology give views over the Thames Estuary towards the Kent coastline to the south. The coastline has been transformed into sandy beaches through the use of groynes and imported sand. The estuary at this point has extensive mud flats. At low tide, the water typically retreats some 600 m from the beach, leaving the mud flats exposed.

History
The southern area of what is now known as Westcliff, south of the London Road, was known as Milton or Milton Hamlet until the period 1860-1880 when the Milton Estate and surrounding land was sold to speculators who preferred the name Westcliff-on-Sea.  By the time the station opened in 1895 it was named Westcliff not Milton. The area between Milton Road and Hamlet Court Road was named The Hamlet by the original developers Brassey, Peto, Betts & Co. when they developed it as a "high class suburban retreat".  Milton Hall (demolished 1900) was on the site of the what is now Nazareth House on the London Road. Hamlet Court was a large house in the area between Hamlet Court Road, Canewdon Road, and Ditton Court Road and was demolished in 1929.

Transport
The London, Tilbury and Southend Railway route passing through the suburb was completed to Southend in 1856 but the Westcliff railway station in Station Road was not opened until 1895.  It is now managed by c2c.

Architecture
Several areas of Westcliff have been classified as conservation areas: Clifftown bordering Southend town centre and including Prittlewell Square gardens,  Shorefield and the Leas towards the sea front, and Milton focused on the Park Estate between Park Street and Milton Road. The Milton Conservation Area includes the Grade II listed building which was formerly the Wesleyan Chapel (Park Road Methodist Church) it was completed in 1872 to the design of Elijah Hoole (1837-1912) and was Southend's first permanent Methodist Church.

Westcliff contains a number of other Grade II listed buildings, Our Lady Help of Christians and St Helen's Church in Milton Road, the Church of Saint Alban the Martyr in St John's Road, the former Havens department store in Hamlet Court Road, Marteg House in Annerley Road, Westcliff Library in London Road and the Palace Theatre. The official list entries for these are available from Historic England on the National Heritage List for England.

Economy
The main shopping area in Westcliff-on-Sea is Hamlet Court Road, where the department store Havens, established in 1901, remained the anchor store until its closure in 2017. Hamlet Court Road took its name from a manor house called the Hamlet Court, which stood on land now occupied by Pavarotti's restaurant and adjoining shops, facing towards the sea with sweeping gardens down to the rail line. The road later developed into a strong independent retail area and quickly became famous outside the area as the Bond Street of Essex. There were many haberdashers and specialist shops, and it was not too unusual to see chauffeurs waiting for their employers to emerge from the shops.

The economic recessions of the 1980s and 1990s saw the area decline. The road underwent a £1 million regeneration in the early 2000s and a further regeneration in 2010.

Leisure

The two main theatres in Westcliff are the Cliffs Pavilion, which overlooks the seafront, and the Palace Theatre.

Westcliff-on-Sea is also home to the Thames Estuary Yacht Club and the Westcliff Casino.

Notable people
Sir Edwin Arnold (1832–1904), poet and journalist, lived at Hamlet Court from 1878.
Trevor Bailey (1923–2011), test cricketer and cricket writer and broadcaster, was born there.
John Barber (1919–2004), former Finance Director of Ford of Europe and managing director of British Leyland.
Dorothea Bate,  Welsh palaeontologist and pioneer of archaeozoology, died in Westcliff-on-Sea in 1951
E. Power Biggs (1906–1977), concert organist was born there.
Robert Williams Buchanan (1841–1901), poet, novelist and playwright, lived at Hamlet Court from 1884.
Dick Clement (1937–) comedy writer and director, was born there.
Geoffrey Crawley photographic expert and journalist. He was the editor in chief of British Journal of Photography for two decades and was noted for exposing the photographs of the Cottingley Fairies taken in the early 20th century as a hoax.
Josh Cullen (1996–), professional footballer who currently plays for Burnley and the Republic of Ireland national team.
Sir Philip Cunliffe-Owen (1828–1894), curator and Director of the South Kensington Museum in London lived at Hamlet Court.
Jean Floud (1915–2013), sociologist and academic, was born there.
 Edward Greenfield (3 July 1928 – 1 July 2015) chief music writer in The Guardian from 1977 to 1993 and biographer of Andre Previn was born there and attended Westcliff High School for Boys.
John Horsely (1920–2014), actor, was born there.
Wilko Johnson (1947-2022) guitarist, singer and songwriter attended Westcliff High School for Boys and lived there until his death.
Frank Matcham (1854–1920), theatre architect, retired to 28 Westcliff Parade, Westcliff-on-Sea and died there in 1920.

Hugh Sells (1922–1978), first-class cricketer and Royal Air Force officer.
Sir Bernard Arthur Owen Williams FBA (1929 – 2003), English moral philosopher.

References

Populated coastal places in Essex
Seaside resorts in England
Southend-on-Sea (town)